QFAB Bioinformatics is a Queensland-based organisation concerned with the provision of resources in bioinformatics, biostatistics and specialised computing platforms. QFAB operates Australia-wide and is a key contributor to the EMBL Australia Bioinformatics Resource.

History 
QFAB was established in 2007,
with funding from the Queensland Government's National and International Research Alliances Program, as a joint venture between The University of Queensland, Queensland University of Technology, Griffith University, CSIRO’s Australian eHealth Research Centre and the Queensland Government’s Department of Agriculture, Fisheries and Forestry.

Mark Ragan from the Institute of Molecular Bioscience (IMB) and Anthony Maeder from the Australian eHealth Research Centre led QFAB's establishment and appointed Jeremy Barker as CEO (2007–2014) to address three critical issues then facing bioinformatics in Queensland:
 integrated data and high-performance computing in a secure environment
 affordable network bandwidth
 access to expert personnel

In 2015, Dominique Gorse became CEO of QFAB and led the strategic alliance with QCIF, the Queensland Cyber Infrastructure Foundation; the two organisations merged in April 2016. QCIF operates significant high-performance computing, cloud computing and data storage resources, is part of the national eResearch infrastructure.

Queensland Cyber Infrastructure Foundation 
QFAB Bioinformatics is a unit of the Queensland Cyber Infrastructure Foundation (QCIF), a not-for-profit member-based organisation.

Members
Central Queensland University
Griffith University
James Cook University
Queensland University of Technology
The University of Queensland
University of Southern Queensland

Affiliate member
University of the Sunshine Coast

Galaxy Australia 
QFAB and QCIF, together with the University of Melbourne's Melbourne Bioinformatics, and the University of Queensland's Research Computing Centre jointly built and operate Galaxy Australia, which is a major feature of the Genomics Virtual Laboratory,
based on the Galaxy (computational biology) scientific workflow system.

References

Bioinformatics organizations
2007 establishments in Australia